Chelmsford Friary was a friary in Essex, England.

Burials
Margaret de Percy de Umfraville, widow of William Ferrers, 3rd Baron Ferrers of Groby

References

Monasteries in Essex